Ectopia, ectopic, or ectopy may refer to:

Ectopia (medicine), including a list of medical uses of ectopia or ectopic
Ectopic pregnancy, a pregnancy that occurs outside the uterus
Ectopic beat, or cardiac ectopy, a disturbance in cardiac rhythm
Ectopia (album), by Steroid Maximus, 2002
Ectopic Entertainment, a record label 
Ectopia, a 2014 novel by Martin J. Goodman

See also

Ecotopia (disambiguation)